Batmanqelenj-e Sofla (also Romanized as Bātmānqelenj-e Soflá; also known as Bātmānqelīch and Bātmānqelīch-e Soflá) is a village in Almalu Rural District, Nazarkahrizi District, Hashtrud County, East Azerbaijan Province, Iran. At the 2006 census, its population was 431, in 70 families.

References 

Towns and villages in Hashtrud County